Abington is an Unincorporated community in Red River Parish, Louisiana, United States.

Notes

Unincorporated communities in Red River Parish, Louisiana
Unincorporated communities in the Ark-La-Tex
Unincorporated communities in Louisiana